Peggy Converse (April 3, 1905, Oregon City, Oregon – March 2, 2001, Los Angeles, California) was an American stage, film, and television actress whose lengthy career spanned seven decades.

She began acting at the age of 16 in Los Angeles. She played ingénue parts in the 1920s and 1930s in Broadway productions of Infernal Machine and The Comedy of Good and Evil. She toured the country, playing 100 roles in productions in over 1000 theaters across the United States and Canada, often with her second husband, fellow actor Don Porter. Her film career started in 1942, with an uncredited part in My Sister Eileen, and concluded with 1988's The Accidental Tourist. She also made guest appearances on television shows from the 1950s to the 1980s, including the unaired pilot episode of Mister Ed.

She graduated from Stanford University in 1927. 

Her first husband was Edmund Converse, the founder of Bonanza Air Lines. After they divorced, she married Porter. Their marriage lasted 53 years, until his death in 1997. They had two children.

Stage credits
 Infernal Machine (?)
 The Comedy of Good and Evil (?)
 Miss Quis (1937) as Crickett
 Wuthering Heights (1939) as Isabel Linton

Filmography
 My Sister Eileen (1942) (uncredited)
 Good Luck, Mr. Yates (1943) (uncredited)
 The Girl of the Limberlost (1945)
 Just Before Dawn (1946) (uncredited)
 The Brute Man (1946) (uncredited)
 Railroaded! (1947)
 Rusty Leads the Way (1948)
 The Devil's Henchman (1949)
 Father Is a Bachelor (1950)
 Borderline (1950) (uncredited)
 The Family Secret (1951)
 Miss Sadie Thompson (1953)
 They Rode West (1954)
 Drum Beat (1954)
 Day of the Badman (1958)
 The Thing That Couldn't Die (1958)
 Voice in the Mirror (1958)
 Cops and Robin (1978 TV movie)
 The Best Place to Be (1979 TV movie)
 The Accidental Tourist (1988)

References

External links
 
 

1905 births
2001 deaths
American film actresses
American stage actresses
American television actresses
People from Oregon City, Oregon
Stanford University alumni